Sybil Ione McLaughlin  (24 August 1928 – 10 May 2022) was a Caymanian politician who became the first Speaker of the Legislative Assembly of the Cayman Islands. She was declared a National Hero in 1996.

McLaughlin was born in Mobile, Alabama in 1928.

In 1945 she started working for the Cayman Islands government and when they received a constitution she was made the clerk. During her career her expertise was used at other parliaments. She worked at the House of Commons of the United Kingdom, Stormont House and in the offices of the governments of Grenada and that of Trinidad and Tobago.

In February 1991 she became the first Speaker of the Cayman Islands Legislative Assembly.

In 1996 she retired from being Speaker and she was made a National Hero of the Cayman Islands. This is the Cayman Islands' highest honour and it was awarded because of her contribution to parliament and to the community in general.

On 10 May 2022 she passed away at her home in South Sound. McLaughlin lay in state in the House of Parliament in the Cayman Islands on 19 May and her funeral was attended the following day.

References

1928 births
2022 deaths
Politicians from Mobile, Alabama
Caymanian women in politics
American emigrants to the Cayman Islands
Members of the Parliament of the Cayman Islands
20th-century British women politicians
Members of the Order of the British Empire
National Heroes of the Cayman Islands